Nava Gadi Nava Rajya is an Indian Marathi language television series directed by Shailesh Dhere and produced by Shruti Marathe and Gaurav Ghatnekar under the banner of Black Coffee Production. It is airing on Zee Marathi by replacing Tuzya Mazya Sansarala Ani Kay Hava. It stars Pallavi Patil, Anita Date-Kelkar and Kashyap Parulekar in lead roles.

Summary 
Anandi is a village girl who has dream of happy married life. She gets engaged with Raghav Karnik who has already married and had one daughter, but still Anandi married to Raghav and Raghav's first wife was deceased but her spirit is spoiling their marriage.

Special episode (1 hour) 
 25 September 2022
 13 November 2022
 1 January 2023
 12 March 2023

Plot  
Raghav Karnik, a widowed corporate lawyer who lives with his daughter Reva Raghav Karnik a.k.a. Chingi, his mother Sulakshana and frequently visited younger Varsha and with the spirit of his deceased wife Rama. Elsewhere, Anandi Parab a simpleton village  girl lives in Anjarle, Konkan region with his father and also frequently visited by her elder sisters. With Rama no more, Raghav takes care of his family but is not able to manage it single handedly. Sulakshana wants him to get married to another girl so that she can be free of work. She visits Anandi in her village along with Varsha to fix her marriage with Raghav without his knowledge and also hiding his previous marriage truth. Anandi and her father accept the proposal. Raghav learns about this and leaves for Konkan to tell Anandi and her family the truth. The family earlier shocked bit later accepts the marriage proposal due to Raghav's kind heartedness. Rama feels dejected and tries to break this alliance but fails. Raghav and Anandi get married and Rama gets freed from the photo frame and reaches the wedding dias. Rama learns that no one can see her other than Anandi who also wears the same Mangalsutra which Rama did. Rama learns that the Mangalsutra is the connection between her and Anandi. 

Everyone shift back to Mumbai and Raghav and Anandi start their marital life. Chingi doesn't readily accept Anandi as her mother. Rama gets envious of Anandi as she takes over her responsibilities and place in the Kanik house. Rama introduces herself as Mrs. Kolate, Rama's best friend and their neighbour to Anandi and befriends her. Rama everytime misguides Anandi about the Karnik to create confusion in the family but fails everytime. As time pass by, Chingi and Anandi bond together well, also Raghav and Anandi starts to get comfortable with each other. Seeing this, Rama gets more jealous and envious. Anandi also try to bond with Rama's parents who live in the same building but they everytime demean her. Soon real Mrs. Kolate arrives and Anandi learns Rama's fake identity. On the occasion of Pitru-Paksha Amavasya, Rama reveals her real identity to Anandi to which she gets immensely scared.

Cast

Main 
 Pallavi Patil as Anandi Parab Karnik, Raghav's second wife, Reva's step-mother.
 Anita Date-Kelkar as Rama Karnik Patkar, Raghav's first wife, Reva's biological mother.
 Kashyap Parulekar as Raghav Karnik, Rama's ex-husband, Anandi's husband, Reva's father.

Recurring 
 Saisha Bhoir as Reva Raghav Karnik (Chingi), Raghav and Rama's daughter and Anandi's step-daughter.
 Varsha Dandale as Sulakshana Karnik, Raghav and Varsha's mother.
 Kirti Pendharkar as Varsha Karnik, Raghav's  sister, Sulakshana's younger daughter, Atul's wife.
 Abhay Khadapkar as Waman Parab (Aaba), Anandi's father.
 Prajakta Wadye as Mai Waman Parab, Anandi's elder sister.
 Mrunal Chemburkar as Malati Purushottam Patkar, Rama's mother.
 Pankaj Chemburkar as Purushottam Patkar, Rama's father.
 Unknown as Atul, Varsha's abusive husband.
 Unknown as Baban Shivalkar, Anandi's cousin.
 Unknown as Tagya, Anandi's nephew.

Awards

References

External links 
 Nava Gadi Nava Rajya at ZEE5

Marathi-language television shows
2022 Indian television series debuts
Zee Marathi original programming